Charles Gould may refer to:

 Charles Gould, afterwards Sir Charles Morgan, 1st Baronet (1726–1806), English Judge Advocate-General
 Charles Gould (geologist) (1834–1893), first Geological Surveyor of Tasmania, 1859–1869
 Charles G. Gould (1845–1916), Union Army soldier and Medal of Honor recipient
 Charlie Gould (1847–1917), American baseball player
 Charles A. Gould (1848–1926), American yachtsman and industrialist 
 Charles Henry Gould (1855–1919), Canadian librarian and musician
 Charles Gould (1904–1968), American film producer known as Charles K. Feldman
 Charles S. Gould, American film director, see The Great Adventures of Captain Kidd